The Stura del Monferrato (also known as the Stura piccola and the Stura di Casale, in each case to distinguish it from other Piedmontese watercourses of the same name: the Stura di Lanzo, the Stura di Demonte and the Stura di Ovada) is a  stream, which runs through Murisengo, Cerrina Monferrato, Mombello Monferrato and Pontestura in the Italian Province of Alessandria.

A right tributary of the Po River it flows in a northeasterly direction within the hilly region of the Basso Monferrato, through the Val Cerrina. (This valley, however, was not formed by the Stura: rather it was excavated by the major watercourse of Piedmont which existed during the Lower Pleistocene, draining the western Alps and following an east-south-easterly course generally to the south of today's Po.)

Its mean discharge of a mere  relies immediately upon precipitation, and is subject to marked seasonal variations.

Notes
This article, as of 3 December 2009, was a free translation of its counterpart in the Italian Wikipedia: specifically this version.

Rivers of the Province of Asti
Rivers of the Province of Alessandria
Monferrato
Rivers of Italy